The Budget Committee is a standing committee of the Icelandic parliament.

Jurisdiction 

According to law № 55/1991, with later amendments, all matters relating to the following subjects are referred to the Budget Committee:

 State finance
 Budget spending
 State assets
 Loan authorisation
 State guarantees
 Pension

Members, 140th parliament 

The main members have seats in the committees and attend the meetings. When they are unable to do so the substitute members temporarily take their place.

Main

Substitute

Chairmen

114th parliament (1991–2011)

140th parliament (2011-present)

See also 

 List of standing committees of the Icelandic parliament

External links 

  
  

Standing committees of the Icelandic parliament